General Sir William Gurdon Stirling,  (25 May 1907 – 29 August 1973) was a British Army officer who reached high office during the 1960s.

Military career
Born the son of Major Charles Stirling (1870–1914) of Ropers Hall, Bures, Suffolk and his wife The Hon. Amy Harriott Gurdon (1864–1944) (daughter of Lord Cranworth), William Stirling was, after attending and later graduating from the Royal Military Academy, Woolwich, commissioned into the Royal Artillery on 30 August 1926. He served in the Second World War as Assistant Military Secretary at the War Office and was deployed to North Africa and North West Europe.

Stirling was appointed Commander, Royal Artillery for the 1st Infantry Division in Palestine during the Palestine Emergency between 1947 and 1948 going on to be Chief of Staff at Anti-Aircraft Command between 1950 and 1952. He was appointed commander 27th Infantry Brigade in 1952 and then Principal Staff Officer to the Chairman of the Chiefs of Staff in 1956. He became General Officer Commanding of the 2nd Division in 1958 and General Officer Commanding-in-Chief for Western Command in 1960.

Stirling went on to be Military Secretary to the Secretary of State for War in 1961 and Commander-in-Chief, British Army of the Rhine and Commander, Northern Army Group in 1963; he retired in 1966.

From 1967 to 1973 Stirling was Gentleman Usher to the Sword of State, an officer of the Royal Household.

Family
In 1941 Stirling married Frances Marguerite Wedderburn Wilson and together they went on to have three daughters.

References

|-
 

|-
 

|-

|-

1907 births
1973 deaths
British Army major generals
British Army personnel of World War II
British military personnel of the Palestine Emergency
Commanders of the Order of the British Empire
Companions of the Distinguished Service Order
Knights Grand Cross of the Order of the Bath
People from Chelsea, London
Royal Artillery officers
War Office personnel in World War II
Military personnel from London
Graduates of the Royal Military Academy, Woolwich